MNE-Python ("MNE") is an open source toolbox for EEG and MEG signal processing. It is written in Python and is available from the PyPI package repository.

See also 

 Neurophysiological Biomarker Toolbox (MatLab)
 EEGLAB (MatLab)
 NeuroKit (Python)

References 

Python (programming language) scientific libraries
Neuroimaging software